Giuseppe Di Serio (born 20 July 2001) is an Italian football player. He plays for  club Perugia.

Club career
On 20 August 2019, he signed his first professional contract, a 2-year deal with Serie B club Benevento, after playing for their junior squad for the previous two seasons.

He made his Serie B debut for Benevento on 15 February 2020 in a game against Pordenone. He substituted Roberto Insigne in the 89th minute.

On 19 January 2022, he joined Pordenone on loan until the end of the 2021–22 season.

On 21 July 2022, Di Serio signed a three-year contract with Perugia.

International career
He made his first appearance for his country in September 2021 for a Under-20 team friendly against Serbia.

Career statistics

References

External links
 

2001 births
Sportspeople from Trento
Living people
Italian footballers
Italy youth international footballers
Association football forwards
Benevento Calcio players
Pordenone Calcio players
A.C. Perugia Calcio players
Serie A players
Serie B players
Footballers from Trentino-Alto Adige/Südtirol